The Hunter 26 is an American trailerable sailboat, that was designed by Rob Mazza and first built in 1994.

Production
The boat was built by Hunter Marine in the United States from 1994 to 1997, but it is now out of production.

The Hunter 26 design was developed into the similar Hunter 260 in 1997.

Design

The Hunter 26 is a small recreational keelboat, built predominantly of fiberglass. It has a fractional sloop rig, a raked stem, a reverse transom, a transom-hung rudder and a centerboard. It displaces  and carries  of flooding water ballast. The ballast is drained for road transport.

The boat is normally fitted with a small outboard motor for docking and maneuvering.

See also
List of sailing boat types

Related development
Hunter 260

Similar sailboats
Beneteau First 26
Beneteau First 265
C&C 26
C&C 26 Wave
Contessa 26
Dawson 26
Discovery 7.9
Grampian 26
Herreshoff H-26
Hunter 26.5
Hunter 260
MacGregor 26
Mirage 26
Nash 26
Nonsuch 26
Outlaw 26
Paceship PY 26
Pearson 26
Parker Dawson 26
Sandstream 26
Tanzer 26
Yamaha 26

References

External links

Keelboats
1990s sailboat type designs
Sailing yachts
Trailer sailers
Sailboat type designs by Rob Mazza
Sailboat types built by Hunter Marine